Emamzadeh Zeyd (also known as Shah Zeyd, Romanized as Emāmzādeh Zeyd) is a village in Hayaquq-e Nabi Rural District, in the Central District of Tuyserkan County, Hamadan Province, Iran. At the 2011 census, its population was 1,503, in 377 families.

References 

Populated places in Tuyserkan County